Ancinnes is a commune in the Sarthe department in the region of Pays de la Loire in north-western France.

It lies within the Parc naturel régional Normandie-Maine and is on the edge of the forest of Perseigne.

It is 8 km from Alençon, the capital of the Orne department and the nearest major town. The commune of Ancinnes has approximately 1,100 residents, called "Ancinnois". The village is centred on the Church of Saint Peter and Saint Paul.

See also
 Communes of the Sarthe department

References

External links

 Ancinnes

Communes of Sarthe